The Yukon is a territory in the northwest of Canada.
Yukon may also refer to:

Places

Yukon
Yukon (electoral district), a federal electoral district of Canada, corresponding to the territory of Yukon
Fort Yukon, a town in Alaska by the Yukon River
Yukon Island, an island in south central Alaska
Yukon River, a river in the state of Alaska, USA and the territory of Yukon, Canada for which the territory was named

United States
Yukon, Florida, a ghost town in the United States
Yukon, Georgia, a community in the United States
Yukon, Missouri, a town in the United States
Yukon, Oklahoma, a town in the United States
Yukon, Pennsylvania, a town in the United States
Yukon, West Virginia, a town in the United States

Arts, entertainment, and media

Fictional entities
Yukon, the name of a fictional confederacy in the novel Fitzpatrick's War by Theodore Judson
 Yukon Cornelius, a character in the 1964 TV special Rudolph the Red-Nosed Reindeer.

Games
 Yukon (solitaire), a single-player card game similar to standard Klondike solitaire
 The Yukon Trail, a computer game similar to The Oregon Trail

Music
Yukon (band), a band from Baltimore, Maryland, in the United States
 "Yukon", song by German/Swedish industrial metal supergroup Lindemann on their album Skills in Pills
 "Yukon (Interlude)", a 2022 song by Joji

Other
Yukon Striker, a B&M Dive Coaster at Canada's Wonderland

Brands and enterprises
 AMD Yukon notebook platform
Yukon Gold (potato), a common Canadian-grown potato
Yukon Jack (liqueur), a whisky liqueur with honey

Transportation

Aircraft
 CC-106 Yukon, a Canadian military turboprop airliner and cargo aircraft used in the 1950s and 1960s

Ships
HMCS Yukon (DDE 263), a Canadian destroyer launched in 1961 that later became an artificial reef off the coast of San Diego, California
USC&GS Yukon, the name of more than one United States Coast Survey or United States Coast and Geodetic Survey ship
, a United States Navy fleet replenishment oiler in service with the Military Sealift Command since 1994
USS Yukon, the name of more than one United States Navy ship

Vehicles
GMC Yukon, various full-size sport utility vehicles made by General Motors
The Giant Yukon and Giant Yukon DISC, mountain bicycles made by Giant Manufacturing

See also
 Klondike Gold Rush, sometimes referred to as the Yukon Gold Rush
 University of Connecticut, often referred to as UConn, a homophone of "Yukon"
 Yukon Gold (disambiguation)
 Yukon, a junior synonym of Scotinotylus, a genus of spiders